The 1912 College of Emporia Fighting Presbies football team was an American football team that represented the Emporia College during the 1912 college football season. The team's head coach was  Homer Woodson Hargiss.

Schedule

References

College of Emporia
College of Emporia Fighting Presbies football seasons
College of Emporia Fighting Presbies football